Andrew Barr is a drummer and producer based in Montreal, Quebec, Canada who is best known for his work with The Barr Brothers and The Slip.

Barr is a founding member of the experimental rock band The Slip (1995–2007) and the critically acclaimed group The Barr Brothers along with his brother Brad Barr. Born in Providence, RI, Andrew began playing the drums at an early age, a student of jazz drummer Bob Gullotti and drummer/percussionist Jamey Haddad (Paul Simon), Andrew studied at Berklee College of Music before spending time in Mali, West Africa studying with master drummer Abdoul Doumbia.

As well as The Barr Brothers, he has performed with an array of artists and appeared on several albums. He has performed and/or recorded with Leslie Feist, M. Ward, Lhasa de Sela, Alexi Murdoch, Natalie Merchant, David Binney, Bassekou Kouyate, Ua, Marco Benevento, Patrick Watson, Land Of Talk, Nathan Moore, Esmerine, Sonya Kitchell, Richard Reed Parry, The Low Anthem, Greg Saunier, Bryce Dessner, Bonnie Light Horseman, Fred Fortin, and Little Scream among others.

The Barr Brothers have recorded three full length albums and an EP; have appeared twice on The Late Show with David Letterman; been regular guests on BBC, CBC, NPR ; have toured the world regularly; and have been nominated for three Juno awards.

Discography 
with The Barr Brothers
The Barr Brothers – The Barr Brothers - 2010
Sleeping Operator – The Barr Brothers - 2014
Alta Falls EP – The Barr Brothers - 2016
Queens Of The Breakers – The Barr Brothers - 2017

Featured on other albums

From the Gecko – The Slip - 1997
Does – The Slip - 2000
Angels Come on Time – The Slip - 2002
Aliveacoustic – The Slip - 2003
Alivelectric – The Slip - 2003
Eisenhower – The Slip - 2006
Invisible Baby – Marco Benevento - 2008
Some Are Lakes – Land Of Talk - 2008
This Storm – Sonya Kitchell - 2008
Fun and Laughter – Land Of Talk - 2009
Me Not Me – Marco Benevento - 2009
Lhasa – Lhasa DeSela– 2009
Cloak and Cipher – Land Of Talk - 2010
Between the Needles and Nightfall – Marco Benevento - 2010
La Lechuza – Esmerine - 2011
TigerFace – Marco Benevento - 2011
Jama Ko – Bassekou Kouyate - 2013
Arc Iris – Arc Iris - 2014
Natalie Merchant - 2014
Ultramarr – Fred Fortin - 2016
Cult Following – Little Scream - 2016
The Story Of Fred Soort – Marco Benevento - 2018
Quiet River of Dust Vol. 1 – Richard Reed Parry - 2018
Bonnie Light Horseman – Bonnie Light Horseman - 2020
Migration Stories – M. Ward - 2020

References

External links 
Andrew Barr on AllMusic
Andrew Barr on LinkedIn

1977 births
Living people
American rock drummers
The Slip (band) members
American male songwriters
Musicians from Montreal
20th-century American drummers
American male drummers
21st-century American drummers
20th-century American male musicians
21st-century American male musicians